Q'urawiri (Quechua huch'uy small, Aymara q'urawiri slinger, someone who catapults something, Q'urawiri the name of a mountain, "little Q'urawiri", Hispanicized spelling Uchuycorahuiri) is a mountain in the Andes of Peru, about  high. It is located in the Apurímac Region, Abancay Province, Circa District. It lies northwest of Q'urawiri.

References

Mountains of Peru
Mountains of Apurímac Region